Camelback may refer to:

 riding atop a camel
 Camelback, a variation of shotgun house with a second floor in the rear of the house.
 Camelback (roller coaster element), a hump-shaped hill element found on roller coasters
 CamelBackCapitalization, a type of capitalization, generally known as CamelCase
 Camelback East, a district of Phoenix adjacent to the mountain
 Camelback High School
 Camelback locomotive, a type of steam locomotive with the cab mounted in the middle, astride the boiler
 Camelback Mountain in Phoenix, Arizona, and a road and numerous establishments in that area
  Camelback Road 
 Camelback Potential, a physics phenomenon
 Camelback Research Alliance Inc., an American equities research firm now known as Gradient Analytics, Inc.
 Camelback Mountain Resort in the Pocono Mountains in Pennsylvania
  Camelback Mountain (Pennsylvania) 
 CamelBak, a brand of water canteen worn as a backpack

See also 
  Back (disambiguation) 
  Camel (disambiguation)